Mała Wieś may refer to the following places:
Mała Wieś, Radomsko County in Łódź Voivodeship (central Poland)
Mała Wieś, Rawa County in Łódź Voivodeship (central Poland)
Mała Wieś, Pomeranian Voivodeship (north Poland)
Mała Wieś, Wieluń County in Łódź Voivodeship (central Poland)
Mała Wieś, Lesser Poland Voivodeship (south Poland)
Mała Wieś, Świętokrzyskie Voivodeship (south-central Poland)
Mała Wieś, Białobrzegi County in Masovian Voivodeship (east-central Poland)
Mała Wieś, Grójec County in Masovian Voivodeship (east-central Poland)
Mała Wieś, Mińsk County in Masovian Voivodeship (east-central Poland)
Mała Wieś, Płock County in Masovian Voivodeship (east-central Poland)
Mała Wieś, Płońsk County in Masovian Voivodeship (east-central Poland)
Mała Wieś, Greater Poland Voivodeship (west-central Poland)